The 2016–17 UIC Flames men's basketball team represented the University of Illinois at Chicago in the 2016–17 NCAA Division I men's basketball season. The Flames, led by second-year head coach Steve McClain, played their home games at the UIC Pavilion as members of the Horizon League. They finished the season 17–19, 7–11 in Horizon League play to finish in sixth place. They defeated Green Bay in the quarterfinals of the Horizon League tournament before losing to Milwaukee in the semifinals. They were invited to the College Basketball Invitational where they defeated Stony Brook and George Washington before losing in the semifinals to Coastal Carolina.

Previous season
The Flames finished the 2015–16 season 5–25, 3–15 in Horizon League play to finish in last place. They lost in the first round of the Horizon League tournament to Wright State.

Departures

Incoming Transfers

Recruiting class of 2016

Recruiting class of 2017

Roster

Schedule and results

|-
! colspan="9" style=| Exhibition

|-
! colspan="9" style=|  Non-conference regular season

|-
!colspan=9 style=| Horizon League regular season

|-
!colspan=9 style=|Horizon League tournament

|-
!colspan=9 style=|CBI

References

UIC Flames
UIC
UIC Flames men's basketball seasons
UIC Flames men's basket
UIC Flames men's basket